Giuseppe Fabiani (27 November 1926 – 25 June 2019) was an Italian Catholic bishop.

Fabiani was born in Bertinoro, Italy and was ordained to the priesthood in 1950. He served as bishop of the Diocese of Imola, Italy, from 1989 until 2002.

Notes

1926 births
2019 deaths
Bishops of Imola